Koigu is a small village in Otepää Parish, Valga County in southeastern Estonia. It has a population of only 23 residents (as of February 7, 2008).

References

Villages in Valga County